M2 is a 2001 album by Jazz fusion musician Marcus Miller, and the winner of the 2002 Grammy Award for Best Contemporary Jazz Album.

Reception
Allmusic awarded the album with 4  stars and its review by Rob Theakston states: "Marcus Miller continues to display his multi-instrument virtuosity with M², and while the order of the day is still smooth jazz, there's more of a soulful R&B edge than the majority of his previous work. It also features an all-star cast that includes Herbie Hancock, Branford Marsalis, Raphael Saadiq, Paul Jackson, Jr., and Lenny White among others."

Track listing
All tracks composed by Marcus Miller except where noted.

 "Power" – 4:37
 "Lonnie's Lament" (John Coltrane) – 5:39
 "Boomerang" – 5:49
 "Nikki's Groove" – 3:28
 "Goodbye Pork Pie Hat" (Charles Mingus) – 3:34
 "Ozell (Interlude 1)" – 0:48
 "Burning Down the House" (David Byrne, Jerry Harrison, Chris Frantz, Tina Weymouth) – 6:54
 "It's Me Again" – 6:05
 "Cousin John" – 4:42
 "Ozell (Interlude 2)" – 0:39
 "3 Deuces" – 5:51
 "Red Baron" (Billy Cobham) – 6:38
 "Ozell (Interlude 3)" – 1:01
 "Your Amazing Grace" – 7:43
 "Boomerang Reprise" – 1:54

Personnel
 Marcus Miller – synthesizer, bass, guitar, vocals, engineer, executive producer, vocoder, drum programming, Wurlitzer
 Wayne Shorter – soprano saxophone
 Branford Marsalis – soprano saxophone
 James Carter- tenor sax 
 Maceo Parker – alto saxophone
 Kenny Garrett – alto saxophone
 Fred Wesley – trombone
 Hubert Laws – flute
 Larry Corbett – cello
 Joel Derouin – violin
 Matt Funes – viola
 Herbie Hancock – piano
 Hiram Bullock – guitar
 Paul Jackson, Jr. – acoustic guitar
 Leroy Taylor – synthesizer bass
 Chaka Khan – vocals
 Djavan – vocals, scat
 Raphael Saadiq – vocals on "Boomerang"
 Poogie Bell – drums
 Vinnie Colaiuta – drums on "It's Me Again"
 Mino Cinelu – percussion
 David Isaac – triangle, producer, overdubs, cowbell, mixing, co-producer, water effects
 Lenny White – percussion, synthesizer bass
 Bernard Wright – organ, Fender Rhodes
 Harold Goode – executive producer
 Harry Martin – executive producer

Production

Ray Bardani  – Mixing
David Isaac  – Engineer and Mix Engineer
Enrico DePaoli  – Engineer
Jack Frisch  – Art Direction, Design
Richard Furch  – Assistant Engineer
Bibi Green  – Production Coordination
Charles Harrison  – String Copyist, String Transcription
Khaliq-O-Vision  – Engineer
Paul Mitchell  – Engineer
Malcolm Pollack  – Engineer

References

2001 albums
Marcus Miller albums
Albums produced by Marcus Miller
Grammy Award for Best Contemporary Jazz Album